Siegfried Wustrow (born 7 May 1936) is a retired German cyclist. He began his career in the early 1950s as an all-rounder, competing in road and cross-country races. However, he had his best achievements in motor-paced racing, winning two silver medals at the UCI Motor-paced World Championships in 1960 and 1961 and the national title in 1961.

After retirement he operated a taxi company in Leipzig and was organizing cycling events.

References

1936 births
Living people
German male cyclists
People from Ludwigslust-Parchim
Cyclists from Mecklenburg-Western Pomerania
People from Bezirk Schwerin
East German male cyclists